The 1860 United States presidential election in Rhode Island took place on November 2, 1860, as part of the 1860 United States presidential election. Voters chose four electors of the Electoral College, who voted for president and vice president.

Rhode Island was won by Republican candidate Abraham Lincoln, who won by a margin of 22.74%.

With 61.37% of the popular vote, Rhode Island would prove to be Lincoln's fifth strongest state in terms of popular vote percentage in the 1860 election after Vermont, Minnesota, Massachusetts and Maine. 

Like New Jersey, New York and Pennsylvania, Rhode Island was one of the four states that had a fusion ticket for the Democrats, which was supported just by the Northern Democrats but also supporters of Southern Democrats and Constitutional Unionists. However, unlike in the other three states the electors on the Democratic ticket in Rhode Island were pledged solely to Douglas, therefore some sources credit the Democratic popular vote to the Northern Democratic nominee.

Results

See also
 United States presidential elections in Rhode Island

References

1860 Rhode Island elections
1860
Rhode Island